High Meadows, also known as Peter White House, is a historic home located near Scottsville, Albemarle County, Virginia.

History 
High Meadows consists of a -story brick dwelling built between 1831 and 1832, and a two-story, 1883 stuccoed brick section. The 1883 addition more than tripled the size of the original dwelling and is connected by a frame, single-story passage which runs between and the length of both sections. The south facade of the 1883 section serves as the front elevation. It is two stories high and three bays wide and features a cross-gabled slate roof.

It was added to the National Register of Historic Places in 1986.

References

Houses on the National Register of Historic Places in Virginia
Houses completed in 1883
Houses in Albemarle County, Virginia
National Register of Historic Places in Albemarle County, Virginia